Y'all Politics is a for profit digital media service focused on political news in the United States state of Mississippi. It was founded in 2004 by Alan Lange, originally to cover that year's race for mayor in Jackson, Mississippi. It is considered to have a politically conservative perspective. In 2013, it was named one of the best state-based political blogs by Chris Cillizza of the Washington Posts blog The Fix.  Y'all Politics staff members are regularly featured in a variety of media outlets as experts on Mississippi politics.  The news site has also been active in recent years conducting polling on Mississippi political issues.

Personnel 
Alan Lange serves as publisher of Y'all Politics, as well as CEO of its parent company, Jackson New Media, Inc, as of 2018. 

Frank Corder serves as its Managing Editor.  He has an extensive background of political writing and broadcasting and is a native of Pascagoula, Mississippi.

Sarah Ulmer is the lead Capitol Reporter.  She is a graduate of Mississippi State University.  

Anne Summerhays is a Capitol Correspondent.  She is a graduate of Millsaps College earning a degree in Political Science along with minors in American Studies and Sociology.

References

External links

American political blogs
Internet properties established in 2004
2004 establishments in Mississippi
American news websites
News aggregators
Mass media in Mississippi